The 2017–18 Portland Trail Blazers season was the franchise's 48th season in the National Basketball Association (NBA). This season is most notable for having a 13-game winning streak in their franchise history (tied), starting with a win over the Utah Jazz on February 23, but was ended with a 111–115 loss to the Houston Rockets on March 20. Despite that, the team still managed to clinch their 5th straight playoff berth on April 1, with a win over the Memphis Grizzlies.

They finished the regular season with 49–33, which secured the 3rd seed and clinched the Northwest Division. In the playoffs, the Trail Blazers faced the 6th seeded New Orleans Pelicans in the First Round, and were swept in 4 games.

Draft picks

Roster

<noinclude>

Standings

Division

Conference

Game log

Preseason

|- style="background:#fcc;"
| 1
| October 3
| Phoenix
| 
| Damian Lillard (18)
| Zach Collins (8)
| Damian Lillard (4)
| Moda Center15,507
| 0–1
|- style="background:#cfc;"
| 2
| October 5
| Toronto
| 
| Damian Lillard (16)
| Aminu, Swanigan (8)
| Damian Lillard (8)
| Moda Center15,505
| 1–1
|- style="background:#cfc;"
| 3
| October 8
| @ LA Clippers
| 
| Damian Lillard (35)
| Meyers Leonard (10)
| Evan Turner (8)
| Staples Center13,276
| 2–1
|- style="background:#cfc;"
| 4
| October 9
| @ Sacramento
| 
| Jusuf Nurkić (16)
| Al-Farouq Aminu (8)
| Damian Lillard (3)
| Golden 1 CenterN/A
| 3–1
|- style="background:#cfc;"
| 5
| October 11
| @ Phoenix
| 
| Meyers Leonard (17)
| Ed Davis (12)
| Evan Turner (6)
| Talking Stick Resort Arena13,230
| 4–1
|- style="background:#cfc;"
| 6
| October 13
| Maccabi Haifa
| 
| Jake Layman (24)
| Collins, Nurkić (8)
| Isaiah Briscoe (7)
| Moda CenterN/A
| 5–1

Regular season

|- style="background:#cfc;"
| 1
| October 18
| @ Phoenix
| 
| Damian Lillard (27)
| Al-Farouq Aminu (12)
| Damian Lillard (5)
| Talking Stick Resort Arena18,055
| 1–0
|- style="background:#cfc;"
| 2
| October 20
| @ Indiana
| 
| CJ McCollum (28)
| Al-Farouq Aminu (16)
| Damian Lillard (7)
| Bankers Life Fieldhouse15,325
| 2–0
|- style="background:#fcc;"
| 3
| October 21
| @ Milwaukee
| 
| Lillard, McCollum (26)
| Davis, Nurkić (11)
| Evan Turner (7)
| Bradley Center16,211
| 2–1
|- style="background:#cfc;"
| 4
| October 24
| New Orleans
| 
| CJ McCollum (23)
| Ed Davis (11)
| Damian Lillard (7)
| Moda Center19,446
| 3–1
|- style="background:#fcc;"
| 5
| October 26
| LA Clippers
| 
| Damian Lillard (25)
| Ed Davis (11)
| Damian Lillard (6)
| Moda Center18,694
| 3–2
|- style="background:#cfc;"
| 6
| October 28
| Phoenix
| 
| Damian Lillard (25)
| Ed Davis (11)
| Damian Lillard (9)
| Moda Center19,343
| 4–2
|- style="background:#fcc;"
| 7
| October 30
| Toronto
| 
| Damian Lillard (36)
| Ed Davis (8)
| Aminu, Turner (3)
| Moda Center18,505
| 4–3

|- style="background:#fcc;"
| 8
| November 1
| @ Utah
| 
| Damian Lillard (33)
| Jusuf Nurkić (11)
| Damian Lillard (8)
| Vivint Smart Home Arena16,685
| 4–4
|- style="background:#cfc;"
| 9
| November 2
| LA Lakers
| 
| Damian Lillard (32)
| Ed Davis (8)
| Lillard, McCollum, Nurkić, Turner (5)
| Moda Center19,469
| 5–4
|- style="background:#cfc;"
| 10
| November 5
| Oklahoma City
| 
| Damian Lillard (36)
| Nurkić, Vonleh (8)
| Damian Lillard (13)
| Moda Center19,393
| 6–4
|- style="background:#fcc;"
| 11
| November 7
| Memphis
| 
| CJ McCollum (36)
| Davis, Vonleh (10)
| Damian Lillard (6)
| Moda Center18,692
| 6–5
|- style="background:#fcc;"
| 12
| November 10
| Brooklyn
| 
| Jusuf Nurkić (21)
| Damian Lillard (9)
| Damian Lillard (6)
| Moda Center19,393
| 6–6
|- style="background:#cfc;"
| 13
| November 13
| Denver
| 
| McCollum, Nurkić (17)
| Noah Vonleh (10)
| Damian Lillard (7)
| Moda Center18,895
| 7–6
|- style="background:#cfc;"
| 14
| November 15
| Orlando
| 
| Damian Lillard (26)
| Damian Lillard (11)
| Damian Lillard (7)
| Moda Center19,206
| 8–6
|- style="background:#fcc;"
| 15
| November 17
| @ Sacramento
| 
| Damian Lillard (29)
| Ed Davis (8)
| Damian Lillard (4)
| Golden 1 Center17,583
| 8–7
|- style="background:#cfc;"
| 16
| November 18
| Sacramento
| 
| CJ McCollum (25)
| Ed Davis (8)
| Damian Lillard (6)
| Moda Center19,522
| 9–7
|- style="background:#cfc;"
| 17
| November 20
| @ Memphis
| 
| CJ McCollum (25)
| Noah Vonleh (18)
| Damian Lillard (4)
| FedExForum15,785
| 10–7
|- style="background:#fcc;"
| 18
| November 22
| @ Philadelphia
| 
| Damian Lillard (30)
| Nurkić, Vonleh (11)
| Shabazz Napier (4)
| Wells Fargo Center20,605
| 10–8
|- style="background:#cfc;"
| 19
| November 24
| @ Brooklyn
| 
| Damian Lillard (34)
| Jusuf Nurkić (15)
| Damian Lillard (9)
| Barclays Center15,246
| 11–8
|- style="background:#cfc;"
| 20
| November 25
| @ Washington
| 
| Damian Lillard (29)
| Noah Vonleh (10)
| Damian Lillard (6)
| Capital One Arena18,092
| 12–8
|- style="background:#cfc;"
| 21
| November 27
| @ New York
| 
| Damian Lillard (32)
| Noah Vonleh (12)
| Jusuf Nurkić (6)
| Madison Square Garden18,409
| 13–8
|- style="background:#fcc;"
| 22
| November 30
| Milwaukee
| 
| Jusuf Nurkić (25)
| Jusuf Nurkić (11)
| Damian Lillard (7)
| Moda Center19,459
| 13–9

|- style="background:#fcc;"
| 23
| December 2
| New Orleans
| 
| Damian Lillard (29)
| Napier, Vonleh (7)
| Damian Lillard (8)
| Moda Center18,730
| 13–10
|- style="background:#fcc;"
| 24
| December 5
| Washington
| 
| Damian Lillard (30)
| Jusuf Nurkić (9)
| Damian Lillard (9)
| Moda Center19,241
| 13–11
|- style="background:#fcc;"
| 25
| December 9
| Houston
| 
| Damian Lillard (35)
| Ed Davis (9)
| Damian Lillard (6)
| Moda Center19,503
| 13–12
|- style="background:#fcc;"
| 26
| December 11
| @ Golden State
| 
| Damian Lillard (39)
| Noah Vonleh (9)
| Evan Turner (4)
| Oracle Arena19,596
| 13–13
|- style="background:#cfc;"
| 27
| December 13
| @ Miami
| 
| CJ McCollum (28)
| Al-Farouq Aminu (13)
| Damian Lillard (6)
| AmericanAirlines Arena19,600
| 14–13
|- style="background:#cfc;"
| 28
| December 15
| @ Orlando
| 
| Damian Lillard (21)
| Jusuf Nurkić (11)
| Lillard, McCollum (4)
| Amway Center16,963
| 15–13
|- style="background:#cfc;"
| 29
| December 16
| @ Charlotte
| 
| CJ McCollum (25)
| Zach Collins (10)
| Damian Lillard (11)
| Spectrum Center16,687
| 16–13
|- style="background:#fcc;"
| 30
| December 18
| @ Minnesota
| 
| McCollum, Nurkić (20)
| Damian Lillard (8)
| Damian Lillard (13)
| Target Center14,187
| 16–14
|- style="background:#fcc;"
| 31
| December 20
| San Antonio
| 
| Damian Lillard (17)
| Ed Davis (11)
| CJ McCollum (6)
| Moda Center19,393
| 16–15
|- style="background:#fcc;"
| 32
| December 22
| Denver
| 
| CJ McCollum (15)
| Ed Davis (7)
| Shabazz Napier (5)
| Moda Center19,473
| 16–16
|- style="background:#cfc;"
| 33
| December 23
| @ LA Lakers
| 
| Maurice Harkless (22)
| Al-Farouq Aminu (10)
| Shabazz Napier (5)
| Staples Center18,997
| 17–16
|- style="background:#cfc;"
| 34
| December 28
| Philadelphia
| 
| CJ McCollum (34)
| Jusuf Nurkić (12)
| CJ McCollum (4)
| Moda Center20,104
| 18–16
|- style="background:#fcc;"
| 35
| December 30
| @ Atlanta
| 
| Shabazz Napier (21)
| Jusuf Nurkić (11)
| Shabazz Napier (6)
| Philips Arena15,877
| 18–17

|- style="background:#cfc;"
| 36
| January 1
| @ Chicago
| 
| CJ McCollum (32)
| Jusuf Nurkić (15)
| CJ McCollum (8)
| United Center20,860
| 19–17
|- style="background:#fcc;"
| 37
| January 2
| @ Cleveland
| 
| Damian Lillard (25)
| Al-Farouq Aminu (9)
| Damian Lillard (6)
| Quicken Loans Arena20,562
| 19–18
|- style="background:#cfc;"
| 38
| January 5
| Atlanta
| 
| CJ McCollum (20)
| Jusuf Nurkić (9)
| Lillard, McCollum, Napier (6)
| Moda Center19,393
| 20–18
|- style="background:#cfc;"
| 39
| January 7
| San Antonio
| 
| CJ McCollum (25)
| Jusuf Nurkić (13)
| McCollum, Napier (7)
| Moda Center19,393
| 21–18
|- style="background:#cfc;"
| 40
| January 9
| @ Oklahoma City
| 
| CJ McCollum (27)
| Jusuf Nurkić (8)
| CJ McCollum (7)
| Chesapeake Energy Arena18,203
| 22–18
|- style="background:#fcc;"
| 41
| January 10
| @ Houston
| 
| Damian Lillard (29)
| Ed Davis (10)
| Damian Lillard (8)
| Toyota Center18,055
| 22–19
|- style="background:#fcc;"
| 42
| January 12
| @ New Orleans
| 
| Lillard, McCollum (23)
| Al-Farouq Aminu (11)
| Damian Lillard (8)
| Smoothie King Center17,003
| 22–20
|- style="background:#fcc;"
| 43
| January 14
| @ Minnesota
| 
| Damian Lillard (21)
| Ed Davis (8)
| Damian Lillard (8)
| Target Center14,739
| 22–21
|- style="background:#cfc;"
| 44
| January 16
| Phoenix
| 
| Damian Lillard (31)
| Al-Farouq Aminu (9)
| Damian Lillard (7)
| Moda Center18,604
| 23–21
|- style="background:#cfc;"
| 45
| January 18
| Indiana
| 
| Damian Lillard (26)
| Jusuf Nurkić (17)
| Damian Lillard (8)
| Moda Center19,071
| 24–21
|- style="background:#cfc;"
| 46
| January 20
| Dallas
| 
| Damian Lillard (31)
| Ed Davis (10)
| Damian Lillard (9)
| Moda Center19,464
| 25–21
|- style="background:#fcc;"
| 47
| January 22
| @ Denver
| 
| Damian Lillard (25)
| Jusuf Nurkić (12)
| Damian Lillard (8)
| Pepsi Center14,474
| 25–22
|- style="background:#cfc;"
| 48
| January 24
| Minnesota
| 
| Damian Lillard (31)
| Ed Davis (10)
| Lillard, Turner (6)
| Moda Center18,920
| 26–22
|- style="background:#cfc;"
| 49
| January 26
| @ Dallas
| 
| Damian Lillard (29)
| Al-Farouq Aminu (12)
| CJ McCollum (5)
| American Airlines Center19,876
| 27–22
|- style="background:#cfc;"
| 50
| January 30
| @ LA Clippers
| 
| Damian Lillard (28)
| Jusuf Nurkić (20)
| Damian Lillard (7)
| Staples Center16,705
| 28–22
|- style="background:#cfc;"
| 51
| January 31
| Chicago
| 
| CJ McCollum (50)
| Jusuf Nurkić (9)
| Damian Lillard (7)
| Moda Center19,000
| 29–22

|- style="background:#fcc"
| 52
| February 2
| @ Toronto
| 
| Damian Lillard (37)
| Al-Farouq Aminu (9)
| Damian Lillard (10)
| Air Canada Centre19,800
| 29–23
|- style="background:#fcc"
| 53
| February 4
| @ Boston
| 
| CJ McCollum (22)
| Aminu, Harkless, Nurkić (8)
| Damian Lillard (9)
| TD Garden18,624
| 29–24
|- style="background:#fcc"
| 54
| February 5
| @ Detroit
| 
| Damian Lillard (20)
| Al-Farouq Aminu (13)
| Damian Lillard (5)
| Little Caesars Arena13,810
| 29–25
|- style="background:#cfc"
| 55
| February 8
| Charlotte
| 
| Jusuf Nurkić (24)
| Al-Farouq Aminu (15)
| Damian Lillard (8)
| Moda Center19,178
| 30–25
|- style="background:#cfc"
| 56
| February 9
| @ Sacramento
| 
| Damian Lillard (50)
| Ed Davis (14)
| Damian Lillard (6)
| Golden 1 Center17,583
| 31–25
|- style="background:#fcc"
| 57
| February 11
| Utah
| 
| Damian Lillard (39)
| Ed Davis (12)
| CJ McCollum (4)
| Moda Center19,730
| 31–26
|- style="background:#cfc"
| 58
| February 14
| Golden State
| 
| Damian Lillard (44)
| Jusuf Nurkić (13)
| Damian Lillard (8)
| Moda Center19,520
| 32–26
|- align="center"
|colspan="9" bgcolor="#bbcaff"|All-Star Break
|- style="background:#cfc"
| 59
| February 23
| @ Utah
| 
| CJ McCollum (26)
| Aminu, Davis (8)
| Lillard, Turner (3)
| Vivint Smart Home Arena18,306
| 33–26
|- style="background:#cfc"
| 60
| February 24
| @ Phoenix
| 
| Damian Lillard (40)
| Jusuf Nurkić (13)
| Damian Lillard (5)
| Talking Stick Resort Arena17,112
| 34–26
|- style="background:#cfc"
| 61
| February 27
| Sacramento
| 
| Damian Lillard (26)
| Ed Davis (12)
| Damian Lillard (12)
| Moda Center19,468
| 35–26

|- style="background:#cfc"
| 62
| March 1
| Minnesota
| 
| Damian Lillard (35)
| Al-Farouq Aminu (12)
| Evan Turner (6)
| Moda Center19,533
| 36–26
|- style="background:#cfc"
| 63
| March 3
| Oklahoma City
| 
| CJ McCollum (28)
| Ed Davis (10)
| Damian Lillard (7)
| Moda Center20,063
| 37–26
|- style="background:#cfc"
| 64
| March 5
| @ LA Lakers
| 
| Damian Lillard (39)
| Jusuf Nurkić (16)
| Damian Lillard (6)
| Staples Center18,997
| 38–26
|- style="background:#cfc"
| 65
| March 6
| NY Knicks
| 
| Damian Lillard (37)
| Ed Davis (14)
| Four players (4)
| Moda Center19,393
| 39–26
|- style="background:#cfc"
| 66
| March 9
| Golden State
| 
| CJ McCollum (30)
| Ed Davis (15)
| Damian Lillard (8)
| Moda Center19,487
| 40–26
|- style="background:#cfc"
| 67
| March 12
| Miami
| 
| Damian Lillard (32)
| Jusuf Nurkić (16)
| Damian Lillard (10)
| Moda Center19,786
| 41–26
|- style="background:#cfc"
| 68
| March 15
| Cleveland
| 
| CJ McCollum (29)
| Jusuf Nurkić (10)
| Damian Lillard (9)
| Moda Center19,806
| 42–26
|- style="background:#cfc"
| 69
| March 17
| Detroit
| 
| Damian Lillard (24)
| Al-Farouq Aminu (12)
| Damian Lillard (8)
| Moda Center19,727
| 43–26
|- style="background:#cfc"
| 70
| March 18
| @ LA Clippers
| 
| Damian Lillard (23)
| Jusuf Nurkić (12)
| Shabazz Napier (8)
| Staples Center17,776
| 44–26
|- style="background:#fcc"
| 71
| March 20
| Houston
| 
| Al-Farouq Aminu (22)
| Jusuf Nurkić (11)
| Damian Lillard (6)
| Moda Center20,012
| 44–27
|- style="background:#fcc"
| 72
| March 23
| Boston
| 
| Lillard, McCollum (26)
| Al-Farouq Aminu (10)
| Damian Lillard (8)
| Moda Center19,575
| 44–28
|- style="background:#cfc"
| 73
| March 25
| @ Oklahoma City
| 
| CJ McCollum (34)
| Jusuf Nurkić (12)
| Damian Lillard (5)
| Chesapeake Energy Arena18,203
| 45–28
|- style="background:#cfc"
| 74
| March 27
| @ New Orleans
| 
| Damian Lillard (41)
| Aminu, Nurkić (10)
| Damian Lillard (6)
| Smoothie King Center15,426
| 46–28
|- style="background:#fcc"
| 75
| March 28
| @ Memphis
| 
| CJ McCollum (42)
| Jusuf Nurkić (8)
| CJ McCollum (5)
| FedExForum16,050
| 46–29
|- style="background:#cfc"
| 76
| March 30
| LA Clippers
| 
| Jusuf Nurkić (21)
| Jusuf Nurkić (12)
| Damian Lillard (6)
| Moda Center20,013
| 47–29

|- style="background:#cfc"
| 77
| April 1
| Memphis
| 
| Damian Lillard (27)
| Al-Farouq Aminu (10)
| Lillard, McCollum (9)
| Moda Center19,545
| 48–29
|- style="background:#fcc"
| 78
| April 3
| @ Dallas
| 
| Damian Lillard (29)
| Jusuf Nurkić (13)
| Lillard, McCollum (8)
| American Airlines Center19,624
| 48–30
|- style="background:#fcc"
| 79
| April 5
| @ Houston
| 
| CJ McCollum (16)
| Jusuf Nurkić (11)
| CJ McCollum (4)
| Toyota Center18,055
| 48–31
|- style="background:#fcc"
| 80
| April 7
| @ San Antonio
| 
| Damian Lillard (33)
| Jusuf Nurkić (12)
| Damian Lillard (5)
| AT&T Center18,610
| 48–32
|- style="background:#fcc"
| 81
| April 9
| @ Denver
| 
| Damian Lillard (25)
| Jusuf Nurkić (19)
| Lillard, McCollum (3)
| Pepsi Center17,467
| 48–33
|- style="background:#cfc"
| 82
| April 11
| Utah
| 
| Damian Lillard (36)
| Nurkić, Aminu (9)
| Damian Lillard (10)
| Moda Center20,186
| 49–33

Playoffs

|- style="background:#fcc;"
| 1
| April 14
| New Orleans
| 
| CJ McCollum (19)
| Jusuf Nurkic (11)
| Damian Lillard (7)
| Moda Center19,882
| 0–1
|- style="background:#fcc;"
| 2
| April 17
| New Orleans
| 
| CJ McCollum (22)
| Al-Farouq Aminu (15)
| CJ McCollum (6)
| Moda Center20,062
| 0–2
|- style="background:#fcc;"
| 3
| April 19
| @ New Orleans
| 
| CJ McCollum (22)
| Aminu, Davis (8)
| Maurice Harkless (4)
| Smoothie King Center18,551
| 0–3
|- style="background:#fcc;"
| 4
| April 21
| @ New Orleans
| 
| CJ McCollum (38)
| Jusuf Nurkic (11)
| Damian Lillard (6)
| Smoothie King Center18,544
| 0–4

Transactions

Trades

Free agency

Re-signed

Additions

Subtractions

References

Portland Trail Blazers seasons
Portland Trail Blazers
Portland Trail Blazers
Portland Trail Blazers
Portland
Portland